Angband may refer to:

Angband (Middle-earth), the fortress of Morgoth in Tolkien's fiction
Angband (video game), a roguelike game named after the fortress
Angband (band), Persian-American rock band